Francesco's Venice is a four-part BBC television documentary series hosted by Francesco da Mosto and first broadcast on BBC2 in 2004. The series follows da Mosto as he explores the history of Venice, beginning with its creation in the 5th century and concluding in the modern era. Each episode focuses upon a certain area of Venetian history, interlaced with various anecdotes from da Mosto's own experiences and family history. A book of the same name was published to accompany the series in 2004.

See also 
Francesco's Italy: Top to Toe
Francesco's Mediterranean Voyage

External links
 
 Francesco's biography

2004 British television series debuts
2004 British television series endings
BBC television documentaries about history
Television series about the history of Italy
Italian culture